Sette Cama Airport  is an airstrip serving Sette Cama, in Ogooué-Maritime Province, Gabon.

See also

 List of airports in Gabon
 Transport in Gabon

References

External links
HERE/Nokia - Sette Cama
Sette Cama Airport
OpenStreetMap - Sette Cama
OurAirports - Sette Cama

Airports in Gabon